Nicoll Halsey House and Halseyville Archeological Sites is a national historic district and archaeological site located at Halseyville in Tompkins County, New York.

It was listed on the National Register of Historic Places in 1993.

References

External links
Halseyville, New York | Dr. Geoffrey McCafferty

Geography of Tompkins County, New York
Houses on the National Register of Historic Places in New York (state)
Historic districts on the National Register of Historic Places in New York (state)
Archaeological sites in New York (state)
National Register of Historic Places in Tompkins County, New York